Alan O'Neill (born 27 August 1973) is an Irish former professional footballer who played in the Football League for Birmingham City. He also played in Ireland.

Career
O'Neill was born in Cork. A forward, he played in Ireland for Cork City and Cobh Ramblers before coming to England to sign for Birmingham City in February 1992 for a fee of £15,000. He made his debut in the Football League Third Division on 29 February 1992, coming on as a substitute in a home game against Stoke City which finished as a 1–1 draw. He played in three more league games during the 1991–92 season, but dropped out of consideration when the club were promoted, and returned to Ireland in 1993.

References

1973 births
Living people
Association footballers from Cork (city)
Republic of Ireland association footballers
Association football forwards
Cork City F.C. players
Cobh Ramblers F.C. players
Birmingham City F.C. players
English Football League players